Alex Pandian  is a 2013 Indian Tamil-language action comedy film written and directed by Suraj that features Karthi and Anushka Shetty, with Karthi in the title role, while Santhanam, Milind Soman, Suman, Prathap Pothen and Nikita Thukral among others play pivotal supporting roles. Devi Sri Prasad composed the music. It was released on 11 January 2013.

Plot 
The film starts with Alex Pandian and Divya jumping off a train in an attempt to escape the goons who are seeking to kill them. Three days later, Alex enters Kaalayan's house. Alex's playful attitude and closeness with Kaalayan's three sisters irritates him, and he makes many attempts to evict Alex from his house, but it only makes the bond between Alex and the sisters stronger. Alex also comes into conflict and shaves the head of a local goon, whose brother Parthiban swears revenge on him, but later, it is revealed like the movie paruthiveeran, that Alex and Parthiban are old friends, and they come to terms.  Meanwhile, Divya is receiving treatment, whilst NRI chemist Alvin Martin and corrupt doctor GKM are in search of the two. Upon finding Alex and Divya, the goons chase them. Kaalayan demands to know who Divya is. Divya happens to be the daughter of the Chief Minister. Alex, a local thief, is asked to kidnap Divya for three days so that the CM would sign the papers which would allow Alvin and GKM to distribute fake medicines with devastating side effects. Alex brings her and keeps her as a hostage in a forest. On the third day, as Alex is driving back, Divya explains the reason for why she was asked to be kidnapped and thus requests him to take her back to her father. Alex decides to save Divya. The film shifts back to the present and by now, Divya has fallen in love with Alex. As fate would have it, the goons arrive at their hiding place. The film ends with Alex killing the villains and uniting with Divya.

Cast

Production

Development 
In April 2008, director Suraj announced that he had signed on with production house Studio Green to make a film with Karthi in the lead role. Early reports suggested that the film would star Anushka Shetty and Priyamani and would be a remake of the successful Telugu language film, Vikramarkudu, though Suraj claimed it would be an original script. However the film was placed on the backburner, with Karthi proceeding to star in a remake of Vikramarkudu under the direction of Siva in a project titled Siruthai (2011). In March, the film was titled as Alex Pandiyan named after Rajinikanth's character from Moondru Mugam. Karthi described Alex Pandian as a masala film since, like other films in the genre, it was a mixture of "entertainment, action and comedy".

Casting 
The film re-emerged in April 2011, where it was announced that the film would be shot and readied for an August 2011 release. Anushka Shetty was signed on to play the leading female role in the film, after delivering consecutive box office successes with Singam, Vaanam and Deiva Thirumagal. Bhavana was approached to play the second heroine in the film but turned the offer stating that the character offered was too glamorous. Subsequently, Nikita Thukral and Lakshmi Rai both claimed they had signed on to play the role, before Suraj later confirmed that Nikhita had edged it. Suraj revealed that Meghna would play another heroine – though conflicting reports had given the role to Meghna Naidu, Meghna Raj and Meghna Nair of Siruthai fame. The role was later given to newcomer Akanksha Puri. Sanusha was roped in for another leading female role in the film, while it was confirmed that Santhanam would play brother to the three girls apart from Anushka. Milind Soman and Suman were selected to play negative roles while Prathap Pothen was selected for a pivotal role.

Filming 
Shooting started on 11 November 2011 at Chalakudy, Kerala without a title. A palatial bungalow was erected inside the forest of Chalakudy area. Elephants and jumbos were passing through the way and disturbing the shoot therefore 20 security guards were appointed to protect the set. The second schedule was shot at Meenambakkam where a huge set was erected for Rs. 2.5 million. There were reports that Ameer Sultan had stalled the shooting of the film, but Ameer refuted the allegations. A song with Karthi and Anushka was shot in Chennai which is of a competition kind of song, another song which is folk was also shot with both of them with Anushka working without break. Shooting was wrapped at Mysore. The stunt sequence on train with Karthi and Anushka with the supervision of Ganesh with six cameras under the expertise of cameraman Saravanan, a train was hired for 15 days for this daring sequence which ran for a length of 30 km from Mysore to Krishnarajasagar dam, A sum of around 20 million was spent on the stunt sequence with 50 stunt artistes flying in from Chennai for the shoot. Over 300 junior artistes were involved in the sequence apart from Milind Soman and Suman.

Release 
Alex Pandian'''s distribution rights for Kerala had been bought by Beebah Creations for   11.5 million and was distributed together with Sayujyam Cine Release.

Reception
Critical responseAlex Pandian unfortunately received mixed to negative reviews from critics. A critic from Sify described it as a "potpourri of commercial mass masala not mixed in the right proportion", going on to conclude: "An old-fashioned entertainer that plays to the gallery, Alex Pandian is exaggerated and formulaic". Pavithra Srinivasan from Rediff stated that the film was a "masala, cliche-ridden entertainer which fails miserably", calling it a "disaster", while giving it 1.5 stars out 5. The Times of India gave it 2.5 out of 5 and wrote, "Alex Pandian, while not really a bad film or a badly-made one, often feels strictly functional. Yes, the comedy sequences work and save the film to an extent, but considering its minimal ambitions, a sense of deja vu and disappointment as you leave the theatre is inescapable". The Hindu's reviewer Malathi Rangarajan wrote, "Karthi tries to infuse spirit and energy into the film with an ample dose of humour, but the story that's run of the mill and comedy that tires you after a point offer little help". Deccan Chronicle wrote that the film "may fail to enthral even die-hard Karthi fans".  Newstrackindia called the film a "disappointing commercial pot-boiler" and added that director Suraj "randomly throws in five songs, plenty of action sequences and good amount of comedy, without any purpose or passion".

 Music 

The film's music was composed by Devi Sri Prasad. The soundtrack consists of 5 songs. The audio rights were secured by Gemini Audio. The album was initially set to release on 24 November, but was postponed and got released on 12 December 2012 on Rajinikanth's birthday. A musical night was held on 30 December.

Behindwoods wrote: "Alex Pandian'' is yet another unpretentious effort from DSP who attempts to offer nothing but lighthearted fun set to an unfailing dance beat. DSP unabashedly sticks to his guns and fires in places".

References

External links 
 

Indian action comedy films
2013 films
2013 masala films
2010s Tamil-language films
Films scored by Devi Sri Prasad
Films shot in Chalakudy
2013 action comedy films
Films shot in Thrissur